Land value taxation history in the Australia dating back from Henry George and Graham Berry. Each Australian state has different laws of land tax.

History
South Australia was the first Australian state to introduce a land tax, based on the unimproved capital value of land, in 1884. In 1910, George Allen (first secretary to the Treasury) founded the Land Tax Office to service land taxes at the federal level as a form of wealth tax and as a means to break up large tracts of underutilised land. Over time, the productivity base of the economy diversified from being mostly agrarian at the beginning of the 20th century, but wealth was held in more diverse forms and therefore federal land taxes were already ineffective. Federal land taxes were imposed until 30 June 1952, but still operate at the state/local level.

Usage
Land tax is generally levied on the unimproved capital value of the land (not the total property value). This is assessed every year.

Land taxes in Australia are levied by the states, and generally apply to land holdings only within a particular state. The exemption thresholds (land tax will become payable at this dollar value) vary, as do the tax rates and other rules. Most Australians do not pay land tax, as most states provide a land tax exemption for the primary home or residence.

By revenue, property taxes represent 4.5% of total taxation in Australia. A government report in 1986 for Brisbane, Queensland advocated a land tax.

The Henry Tax Review of 2010 commissioned by the federal government recommended that state governments replace stamp duty with land value tax. The review proposed multiple marginal rates and that most agricultural land would be in the lowest band with a zero rate. Only the ACT moved to adopt this system and planned to reduce stamp duty by 5% and raise land tax by 5% for each of 20 years.

Stamp duty
The difference between land tax and stamp duty is that the stamp duty is charged by state/territory governments on transactions like buying property and the land tax is charged by most state/territory governments on land you own.

Notes

References

Further reading
 

Land value taxation
Taxation in Australia